Pope Boniface IX (r. 1389–1404) created 8 cardinals in two consistories held during his pontificate including his future successor Pope Innocent VII and the Antipope John XXIII.

18 December 1389
 Enrico Minutoli
 Bartolomeo Oleario O.F.M.
 Cosmato Gentile de' Migliorati
 Cristoforo Maroni

27 February 1402
 Antonio Caetani
 Baldassare Cossa
 Leonardo Cibo
 Angelo Cibo

References

Sources

College of Cardinals
Boniface IX
 Bon